Indre Offerdal or Ofredal is a small village on the shore of the Årdalsfjorden (a branch of the Sognefjord) in Årdal Municipality in Vestland county, Norway. The village is only accessible by road through the Offerdal Tunnel, a small tunnel between Seimsdalen and Indre Offerdal.

The village was the administrative center of the municipality of Årdal more than 100 years ago. In those days, the main industry in Årdal was lumber, and Indre Offerdal had a strategic position near the forests and accessible by boat.  Timber and grains were brought here from all over the region for use at the gristmill and sawmill. Materials were then shipped to Bergen.

Today, a small museum is built on the shore of the fjord. It consists of ten buildings including a mill, a sawmill, a warehouse, and several farm buildings dating back to the 19th century. The museum is "living" and provides meals as well as accommodation and meeting facilities. There are guided tours from June through August, or by appointment.

References

Årdal
Villages in Vestland